The Shekel function is a multidimensional, multimodal, continuous, deterministic function commonly used as a test function for testing optimization techniques.

The mathematical form of a function in  dimensions with  maxima is:

or, similarly,

Global minima 

References 

Shekel, J. 1971. "Test Functions for Multimodal Search Techniques." Fifth Annual Princeton Conference on Information Science and Systems.

See also 
Test functions for optimization

Mathematical optimization
Functions and mappings